

This is a list of more than 1,100 properties and districts in Nebraska that are on the National Register of Historic Places. Of these, 20 are National Historic Landmarks. There are listings in 90 of the state's 93 counties.

Current listings by county

Adams County

Antelope County

Arthur County

|}

Banner County

|}

Blaine County
There are no properties listed on the National Register of Historic Places in Blaine County.

Boone County

|}

Box Butte County

|}

Boyd County

|}

Former listings

|}

Brown County

|}

Buffalo County

Burt County

Butler County

Cass County

Cedar County

Chase County

Cherry County

Cheyenne County

Clay County

Colfax County

Cuming County

|}

Custer County

Dakota County

|}

Dawes County

Dawson County

Deuel County

|}

Dixon County

|}

Dodge County

Douglas County

Dundy County

|}

Fillmore County

Franklin County

Frontier County

|}

Furnas County

|}

Gage County

Garden County

|}

Garfield County

|}

Former listings

|}

Gosper County

|}

Grant County

|}

Greeley County

|}

Hall County

Hamilton County

|}

Former listings

|}

Harlan County

Alma Carnegie Library,
111 North John St.,
Alma, MP100007149,
LISTED, 11/8/2021 

|}

Hayes County

|}

Hitchcock County

|}

Holt County

Hooker County

|}

Howard County

|}

Jefferson County

Johnson County

|}

Former listings

|}

Kearney County

Keith County

Keya Paha County

|}

Kimball County

|}

Former listings

|}

Knox County

Lancaster County

Lincoln County

Logan County
There are no properties listed on the National Register of Historic Places in Logan County.

Loup County

|}

Madison County

McPherson County
There are no properties listed on the National Register of Historic Places in McPherson County.

Former listing

|}

Merrick County

Morrill County

Nance County

Nemaha County

Nuckolls County

Otoe County

Pawnee County

Perkins County

|}

Phelps County

|}

Pierce County

|}

Platte County

Polk County

|}

Red Willow County

Richardson County

Rock County

|}

Saline County

Sarpy County

Saunders County

Scotts Bluff County

Seward County

Sheridan County

Sherman County

|}

Sioux County

Stanton County

|}

Thayer County

|}

Thomas County

|}

Former listing

|}

Thurston County

|}

Former listings

|}

Valley County

Washington County

Wayne County

|}

Webster County

Wheeler County

|}

York County

|}

Former listings

|}

See also
List of National Historic Landmarks in Nebraska

References

External links

–Nebraska State Historical Society

 
Nebraska